Cardona is a city in the Soriano Department, in southwestern Uruguay. The main square of the city is Plaza Artigas, featuring a monument to General Artigas.

Geography
The city is located on the border with Colonia Department and it forms a unified population centre together with Florencio Sánchez, which is across the border and belongs to Colonia Department. Bulevard Cardona - Florencio Sanchez, which runs parallel to the railroad tracks, separates the two parts.

History 
Cardona was founded on 17 October 1903. On 18 April 1910, it was declared a "Pueblo" (village) by the Act of Ley Nº 3.607. At the time the area it was in was called "La Lata del Perdido" and the village had previously been the head of the judicial section of "Perdido". On 12 June 1953, its status was elevated to "Villa" (town) by the Act of Ley N° 11.946, and on 15 October 1963, it was further elevated to "Ciudad" (city) by the Act of Ley N° 13.167.

Population 
In 2011, Cardona had a population of 4,600.
 
Source: Instituto Nacional de Estadística de Uruguay

Places of worship
 Parish Church of Our Lady of Luján and St. Elizabeth (Roman Catholic)

Government 
The city mayor as of July 2010 is Raúl Bertinat.

Twin towns 
  Cardona, Catalonia

References

External links 
  
INE map of Cardona and Florencio Sánchez (Colonia)

Populated places in the Soriano Department
Populated places established in 1903
1903 establishments in Uruguay